Pogo transposable element with ZNF domain is a protein that in humans is encoded by the POGZ gene.

The protein encoded by this gene appears to be a zinc finger protein containing a transposase domain at the C-terminus. 

This protein was found to interact with the transcription factor SP1 in a yeast two-hybrid system. At least three alternatively spliced transcript variants encoding distinct isoforms have been observed.

Clinical significance
Heterozygous mutation of POGZ causes White-Sutton syndrome.

References

Further reading